Škofja Riža is a settlement in the Municipality of Trbovlje in central Slovenia. It lies in the hills south of the right bank of the Sava River, east of Dobovec. It is now included with the rest of the municipality in the Central Sava Statistical Region.

References

External links
Škofja Riža on Geopedia

Populated places in the Municipality of Trbovlje